Jeong Gyeong-mi (born July 26, 1985 in Gunsan, Jeollabuk-do, South Korea) is a South Korean judoka.

In 2006, she won her first international gold medal at the 18th World University Judo Championship in Suwon, South Korea. Jeong also won a bronze medal in the -78 kg category at the 2007 World Judo Championships, a silver medal in the same weight category at the 2007 Asian Judo Championships, and a bronze medal at the 2008 Summer Olympics.

References

External links
 
 

1985 births
Living people
Judoka at the 2008 Summer Olympics
Judoka at the 2012 Summer Olympics
Olympic judoka of South Korea
Olympic bronze medalists for South Korea
Olympic medalists in judo
Asian Games medalists in judo
Medalists at the 2008 Summer Olympics
Judoka at the 2010 Asian Games
Judoka at the 2014 Asian Games
South Korean female judoka
Asian Games gold medalists for South Korea
Medalists at the 2010 Asian Games
Medalists at the 2014 Asian Games
Universiade medalists in judo
Universiade bronze medalists for South Korea
Medalists at the 2011 Summer Universiade
People from Gunsan
Sportspeople from North Jeolla Province
20th-century South Korean women
21st-century South Korean women